The Lockheed Constellation ("Connie") was a propeller-driven airliner powered by four 18-cylinder radial Wright R-3350 engines. It was built by Lockheed between 1943 and 1958 at its Burbank, California, USA, facility. A total of 856 aircraft were produced in four models, all distinguished by a triple-tail design and dolphin-shaped fuselage. The Constellation was used as a civilian airliner and as a U.S. military air transport, seeing service in the Berlin Airlift. It was the presidential aircraft for U.S. President Dwight D. Eisenhower.

Accidents and incidents
Like every other major type in long service and operation, accidents and incidents have been recorded that have substantially reduced the numbers flying. The following list is typical of such a record of operational use. The fatalities listed below only include those who were on board Lockheed Constellations.

1943–1949

1950–1959

1960–1969

1970–1998
Most models of the Lockheed Constellation were retired in the late 1970s by operators in favor of more modern aircraft. The last commercial flight of the L-1049 Super Constellation was in 1993, when the Federal Aviation Administration banned all airlines from the Dominican Republic that flew Constellations to the United States (due to safety concerns). The Dominican airlines were the last operators of any version of the Constellation.

Notes

References

Bibliography

 Birtles, Phillip. Lockheed L-1011 TriStar (Airliner Color History). St. Paul: Minnesota: Motorbooks Intl., 1998. .
 Boyne, Walter J. Beyond the Horizons: The Lockheed Story. New York: St. Martin's Press, 1998. .
 Cacutt, Len, ed. “Lockheed Constellation.” Great Aircraft of the World. London: Marshall Cavendish, 1989. .
 Germain, Scott E. Lockheed Constellation and Super Constellation. North Branch, Minnesota: Specialty Press, 1998. .
 Marson, Peter J. The Lockheed Constellation Series. Tonbridge, Kent, UK: Air-Britain (Historians), 1982. .
 Pace, Steve. X-Planes: Pushing the Envelope of Flight. Osceola, Wisconsin: Zenith Imprint, 2003. .
 Sampson, Anthony. Empires of the Sky: The Politics, Contest and Cartels of World Airlines. London: Hodder and Stoughton, 1985. .
 Smith, M.J. Jr. Passenger Airliners of the United States, 1926–1991. Missoula, Montana: Pictorial Histories Publishing Company, 1986. .
 Stringfellow, Curtis K. and Peter M. Bowers. Lockheed Constellation: A Pictorial History. St. Paul, Minnesota: Motorbooks, 1992. .
 Taylor, Michael J.H., ed. “Lockheed Constellation and Super Constellation.” Jane’s Encyclopedia of Aviation. New York: Crescent, 1993. .
 United States Air Force Museum Guidebook. Wright-Patterson AFB, Ohio: Air Force Museum Foundation, 1975.
 Yenne, Bill, Lockheed. Greenwich, Connecticut: Bison Books, 1987. .

Further reading

 1949 crash on Sao Miguel: "Constellation" by Adrien Bosc (2016)

Lockheed Constellation
Accidents